The men's 3000 metres steeplechase at the 1978 European Athletics Championships was held in Prague, then Czechoslovakia, at Stadion Evžena Rošického on 1 and 3 September 1978.

Medalists

Results

Final
3 September

Heats
1 September

Heat 1

Heat 2

Heat 3

Participation
According to an unofficial count, 32 athletes from 16 countries participated in the event.

 (1)
 (1)
 (3)
 (1)
 (2)
 (1)
 (2)
 (1)
 (3)
 (3)
 (3)
 (2)
 (3)
 (1)
 (2)
 (3)

References

3000 metres steeplechase
Steeplechase at the European Athletics Championships